EXCELR8 Motorsport is a British racing team that is headed by Justina Williams, and is currently competing in both the MINI CHALLENGE and British Touring Car Championship.

The team has successfully competed in the MINI CHALLENGE since 2010 racking up multiple championships in both the Cooper and JCW classes, including in the most recent 2020 season when it carried Nathan Harrison to the JCW crown.

Joining the BTCC in 2019, the team ran ex-Triple Eight & AmD MG6 GT cars with drivers Rob Smith and Sam Osborne. In what was very much a learning year, the team was able to secure two points scoring finishes as it learned the ropes with a focus on then taking a step forwards in year two of the programme.

In 2020, the team replaced the aging MG with brand new Hyundai i30 Fastback N Performance cars that it had developed in house during the winter. Senna Proctor and Chris Smiley would share driving duties and both secured podium finishes, despite the COVID-19 pandemic restricting the amount of testing that was possible with the new car.

For 2021, EXCELR8 joined forced with Trade Price Cars to enter four Hyundais under the name EXCELR8 Trade Price Cars, retaining the services of Chris Smiley, and taking on Tom Ingram, Jack Butel, and Rick Parfitt Jr.

References

External links
 EXCELR8 Motorsport Official Site
 EXCELR8 Motorsport on Twitter

British Touring Car Championship teams
British auto racing teams

Auto racing teams established in 2007